Jacques Bernard may refer to:

 Jacques Bernard (theologian) (1658–1718), French theologian and publicist
 Jacques Bernard (actor) (born 1929), French actor
 Jacques Antoine Bernard (1880–1952), French writer and editor